The men's singles was one of five events of the 1921 World Hard Court Championships tennis tournament held in Paris, France from 28 May until 5 June 1921. The draw consisted of 47 players. William Laurentz was the defending champion, but lost in the quarterfinals. Bill Tilden became the first American to win the Championship after beating Jean Washer of Belgium in the final.

Draw

Finals

Top half

Section 1

Section 2

Bottom half

Section 3

Section 4

References 

Men's Singles